The MIT Lincoln Laboratory TX-2 computer was the successor to the Lincoln TX-0 and was known for its role in advancing both artificial intelligence and human–computer interaction. Wesley A. Clark was the chief architect of the TX-2.

Specifications 
The TX-2 was a transistor-based computer using the then-huge amount of 64K 36-bit words of magnetic-core memory. The TX-2 became operational in 1958. Because of its powerful capabilities, Ivan Sutherland's revolutionary Sketchpad program was developed for and ran on the TX-2. One of its key features was the ability to directly interact with the computer through a graphical display.

The compiler was developed by Lawrence Roberts while he was studying at the MIT Lincoln Laboratory.

Relationship with DEC 
Digital Equipment Corporation was a spin-off of the TX-0 and TX-2 projects.  The TX-2 Tape System was a block addressable 1/2" tape developed for the TX-2 by Tom Stockebrand which evolved into LINCtape and DECtape.

Role in creating the Internet 
Dr. Leonard Kleinrock developed the mathematical theory of packet networks which he successfully simulated on the TX-2 computer at Lincoln Lab.

References

External links 
TX-2 documentation at bitsavers.org
Interview with UCLA's Dr. Leonard Kleinrock

One-of-a-kind computers
Transistorized computers
36-bit computers